Aakhari Poratam is a 1988 Indian Telugu-language action film produced by C. Ashwini Dutt under the Vyjayanthi Movies banner and directed by K. Raghavendra Rao. It stars Nagarjuna, Sridevi and Suhasini with music composed by Ilaiyaraaja. Based on the novel Aakhari Poratam, written by Yandamuri Veerendranath. The film was premiered at the 12th International Film Festival of India in the mainstream section.

Plot
The story is about CBI officer Pravallika trying to expose the illegal activities of a notorious criminal Anantananda Swamy. Stage artiste Vihari helps Pravallika in this mission.

Cast 

 Nagarjuna as Vihari
 Sridevi as Pravallika
 Suhasini as Sunadha Mala
 Chandra Mohan as Padmakar
 Amrish Puri as Anantananda Swamy
 Satyanarayana as Parameshwaram
 Jaggayya as Pratap Rao
 Nutan Prasad as Surya Rao
 Pradeep Shakthi
 Suthi Velu 
 P. J. Sarma as Dr. Murthy
 Peketi Sivaram as CBI Chief
 Jayanthi as Vardhani
 Mamatha
 Nirmalamma
 Master Rajesh as Swamy

Soundtrack

Songs were composed by Ilaiyaraaja.  Veturi scored the lyrics for four songs while Jonnavittula for one song "Gundelo Thakita". Music released on ECHO Music Company. Here, singer K. S. Chitra does her debut song Abha Deeni Sooku in Telugu.

References

External links

1988 films
Films based on Indian novels
Films directed by K. Raghavendra Rao
Films scored by Ilaiyaraaja
Films based on novels by Yandamuri Veerendranath
1980s Telugu-language films